Arras Pays d'Artois is a French women's basketball team based in the city of Arras, playing in the Ligue Féminine de Basketball. Formerly a section of multisports club ASPTT Arras, it became an independent club in 2008.

It reached the final of the 2010-11 FIBA EuroCup, lost to Elitzur Ramla.

2011-12 roster
  Nadezhda Grishaeva (1.95)
  Pauline Akonga (1.88)
  Sabrina Reghaissia (1.88)
  Laury Aulnette (1.87)
  Soana Lucet (1.86)
  Juliana Mialoundana (1.85)
  Krissy Bade (1.82)
  Alexandra Tchangoue (1.80)
  Alexia Rol (1.75)
  Adja Konteh (1.73)
  Joelly Belleka (1.68)
  Joyce Cousseins (1.65)
  Leilani Mitchell (1.65)

Coaches 
 Bruno Blier, assisted by Cécile Constanty
 Thibaut Petit

Notable players
 Gabriela Mărginean

See also
Sport in France

References

External links
 Official website

Women's basketball teams in France
Basketball teams established in 2007